The Rutgers Scarlet Knights softball team represents Rutgers University–New Brunswick in NCAA Division I college softball.  The team participates in the Big Ten Conference. The Scarlet Knights are currently led by head coach Kristen Butler. The team plays its home games at Rutgers Softball Complex located on the university's campus.

History

Coaching history

Source:

Coaching staff

References

 
Big Ten Conference softball